The 47 class are a class of diesel-electric locomotives built by A Goninan & Co for the Public Transport Commission in 1972–1973.

History

Twenty were ordered from A Goninan & Co with the first delivered in July 1972. After undergoing acceptance trials, the first entered service in September 1972 with the last delivered in May 1973. Originally intended for use hauling coal services in the Hunter Valley, they were allocated to Bathurst to operate services in the state's west from Lithgow to Euabalong West, Bourke and Cootamundra and all branches in between.  Their excellent ride qualities saw them find favour with crews, although they did suffer from overheating with one destroyed by fire in April 1974 and another in a collision in March 1977.

In January 1981, it was decided to transfer the class to Broadmeadow to take up the duties they had originally been built for being used to haul coal services from Belmont, Dudley, Lambton and Pelton. They also saw use on services to Werris Creek, Tamworth and Moree. They continued to return to Bathurst Workshops for overhaul. A downturn in traffic as a result of a drought saw them placed in store at Parkes in 1982/83 before all were reactivated in 1984 resuming duties out of Broadmeadow.

In 1987, 4719 was withdrawn from service and stored at Bathurst Workshops as a source parts to keep sister units working, being joined by 4715 in November 1988. In 1989, both were moved from to Cardiff Workshops to be rebuilt as HTV2000, a Heavy Test Vehicle.

Despite their favouritism with crews, their high maintenance costs saw them selected for withdrawal in 1989 with only six in service or under repair by November 1989 with the last being taken out of service in December 1990.

In 1990, the Lachlan Valley Railway purchased 47s 01 and 08 followed in February 1994 by 02, 03, 07 and 16. A later purchase was 4717. These were used to operate wheat services in the Cowra region in 1993/94.

In June 1999, they commenced operating trip working services between Port Botany and the Cooks River container terminal in Sydney for Lachlan Valley Rail Freight followed in July 1999 by a service between Cooks River and Carrington for R&H Transport Services.

As of July 2019, 3 Lachlan Valley Railway units remain in service, primarily operating AK Car test trains for ARTC. In March 2022, 4717 was cut up for scrap.

Fleet status

References

Further reading

Co-Co locomotives
Diesel locomotives of New South Wales
Railway locomotives introduced in 1972
Standard gauge locomotives of Australia
Diesel-electric locomotives of Australia